TV 2 Film was a 24-hour two-star movie channel owned by TV 2.

It was launched on November 1, 2005, at 9 p.m. First to air was the Danish feature film The Green Butchers.

The channel mostly shows American two-star movies. Each movie is shown many times over the course of several days.

In August 2008, the channel started broadcasting in the widescreen format. This was followed by the launch of a high-definition simulcast of the channel on January 1, 2009.

The channel was developed from a film strand on TV 2 called "en go' film uden afbrydelser" ("A good movie without interruptions"). Initially, the channel carried advertising between the films, but this practise was discontinued in 2007 as the advertising sales had remained modest.

On satellite, TV 2 Film (as well as TV 2 Charlie and TV 2 Film) was initially exclusively available via Canal Digital. The competing Viasat platform started broadcasting the channels in January 2009.

Since 1 November 2009, the channel also became available terrestrially (via Viaccess-technology by Boxer-approved digital boxes and cards), the same date as Denmark closed down all analogue terrestrial broadcasting and started up DVB-T and MPEG2/MPEG4 digital terrestrial broadcasting. Since then, DVB-T2 has been introduced for HD and TV2 Film is now terrestrially broadcast both as HD (through DVB-T2 & MPEG4) and SD (through DVB-T and MPEG4).

In January 2012, the channel was dropped by Denmark's leading cable provider YouSee after they failed to agree on pricing and conditions. The penetration dropped further in January 2013, when Viasat dropped TV 2 Film. After that, the channel would only be available via Canal Digital, Boxer, Stofa and smaller IPTV and cable providers.

In August 2014, TV 2 announced that TV 2 Film was to be closed down and replaced by a then unnamed sports channel in early 2015.

References

External links
 

Defunct television channels in Denmark
Television channels and stations established in 2005
Television channels and stations disestablished in 2015
2005 establishments in Denmark
2015 disestablishments in Denmark